Sir Billi (also known as Guardian of the Highlands) is a 2012 British computer-animated adventure comedy film directed by Sascha Hartmann and written by his wife Tessa Hartmann, based on an original story they developed together. Produced by Billi Productions, the film stars the voices of Sean Connery, Alan Cumming, Patrick Doyle and Kieron Elliott. Set in the Scottish Highlands, the film follows Sir Billi, an elderly veterinarian who, with the help from his friend Gordon the Goat and the townspeople of Catterness, embarks on an adventure to rescue a beaver named Bessie Boo, while also helping her escape from a corrupt police officer. The film is Scotland's first computer-animated feature film. Connery had actually retired in 2006, but eventually joined the film's cast as a favour to the Hartmanns. 

Since Connery served the role of the title character, the film makes numerous references to the James Bond films, even down to parodying the opening sequence of The Spy Who Loved Me. It was Connery's first film role since The League of Extraordinary Gentlemen (2003), and also his final role before his retirement in 2012 and death caused by respiratory failure due to pneumonia on October 31, 2020. The film was originally released on April 13, 2012 by Shoreline Entertainment, premiering at the Sonoma International Film Festival, and was re-released theatrically on September 13, 2013. The film was critically panned for its incoherent plot, ugly character designs, lackluster animation and crude humour, with many considering the film to be a sour note for Sean Connery to end his career on. The film was also a box office disappointment as it only earned $15,838. Not only was it considered to one of the worst animated films of all time, but there were some critics who went as far to compare it to Foodfight!, in terms of quality.

Plot
Sir William “Billi” Sedgewick works as veterinarian and resides with Gordon, a goat who behaves as a dog, outside the small town of Catterness, located within the Scottish Highlands. On orders of the Scottish government, beavers have become illegal in Scotland and are to be sent to Norway. During one such removal, a lorry carrying a large group of beavers is involved in an accident, letting loose some of the beavers. The officers in charge of the operation, McKenzie and McTavish, manage to recapture most of the beavers, but one escapes. The escapee, Bessie Boo, is subsequently adopted by a family of rabbits. McKenzie, posing as a police officer, mounts an obsessive search for Bessie.

Five years pass as McKenzie continues his search for Bessie. Meanwhile, Bessie and the rabbits partake in a tobogganing race. Bessie's adoptive brother, named Wee Dave, and their mother fall into a river due to the former's carelessness, leading Bessie to attempt to rescue them. Billi, Gordon, and Billi's grandson, Jake, are driving towards Catterness when another rabbit alerts them of the problem. Billi organises a deputation in the town square before noticing McKenzie acting strangely and questioning his identity.

During the group's search, Billi finds and resuscitates Bessie's mother, and soon locates Bessie and Dave approaching Baron McToff's dam. McToff, despite his protests, accepts Billi's demands to turn off the turbines. The group manages to rescue Dave, only to miss Bessie. Gordon bungee-jumps down to catch Bessie, but himself falls into the river. The group retrieves Gordon, but they are distracted by a submarine. Billi gathers a group to save Gordon with a trampoline, but Gordon is knocked out. Victoria, a pilot duck assisting with the group's rescue, throws Billi a bottle of water, which he uses to revive Gordon.

Lady Serena, Billi's daughter, hands Bessie to the submarine's pilot, but McKenzie absconds with Bessie. McKenzie then hijacks Billi‘s Land Rover, causing Billi to give chase in his Aston Martin and eventually on his skateboard across the Highlands. Ending up outside of a military base, McKenzie tries to have Billi arrested, before they are both confronted by the police. McKenzie is himself arrested for his crimes, while Billi promises to reunite Bessie with her family. The townspeople celebrate their victory at the Catterness Inn, while Bessie is returned to her mother. Billi and his consort, Toni Turner, leave the celebration to drive off into the moonlight.

Voice cast 
 Sean Connery as Sir Billi
 Alan Cumming as Gordon the Goat
 Patrick Doyle as The Admiral
 Kieron Elliott as Arresting Officer
 Greg Hemphill as Mr. McTavish
 Ford Kiernan as Banjo Barry
 Miriam Margolyes as Baroness Chantal McToff
 Alex Norton as Baron McToff
 Barbara Rafferty as Barbara the Jag
 Amy Sacco as Toni Turner
 Larry Sullivan as Lady Serena
 Ruby Wax as Patti Turner

Critical response
On Metacritic, the film has a weighted average score of 17 out of 100, based on 4 critics, indicating "overwhelming dislike".

The negative reaction to the film was widely reported in the British press. Peter Debruge of Variety called it "woefully anaemic", criticising its "simplistic story and non-sequitur style". They also pointed out a few in-jokes referencing Connery's past role as James Bond, such as title sequence featuring a Shirley Bassey song that pastiches Bond themes. Siobhan Synnot of The Scotsman called it "mirthless" and "rudimentary". Russ Fischer of SlashFilm criticized it as an "ignominious" end to Connery's career, even compared to his previous film, the critically reviled The League of Extraordinary Gentlemen. Fred Patten of Flayrah called the CG "the ugliest that I have ever seen". Journalist Lisa Summers was also harshly critical of both the CGI and the story. F Bomb Movie Review felt it badly failed to connect with today's children.

Tracy Moore of Common Sense Media gave the film a 2 out of 4 star rating, writing: "GUARDIAN OF THE HIGHLANDS has a bit of an identity crisis: It's an animated children's movie about saving an endangered beaver but with the winking sultriness at times of a grown-up action movie. It borrows heavily from James Bond in the introduction, action, and treatment of female characters, who are often shown with heaving, exaggerated cleavage. There are some nice ideas about preserving wildlife and endangered species, and the community must work together to save the day against the evil corporation and corrupt officers. And fans of Sean Connery may enjoy his wisecracking role as a veterinarian/skateboarder/ladies' man. But there's a bit of a mishmash of action and jokes here without a lot of meaningful plot development and some iffy portrayals that muddle the positive messages".

Despite the film's largely negative reception, AM FM Magazine said Sir Billi was well received on its premiere at the Sonoma International Film Festival.

References

External links
 
 
 
 
 Sir Billi at the Sonoma International Film Festival

2012 films
2012 comedy films
2012 computer-animated films
2010s adventure comedy films
British adventure comedy films
British children's animated films
British children's adventure films
British children's comedy films
British computer-animated films
Scottish films
English-language Scottish films
Animated films about aviation
Films scored by Patrick Doyle
2010s English-language films
2010s British films